The Mayor of Luxembourg City is the mayor of Luxembourg's capital and largest city, Luxembourg City. The officeholder, like other mayors in Luxembourg, is appointed by the Grand Duke amongst council members. Due to the city's importance within the country (being home to almost one in six Luxembourgers), the position as Mayor of Luxembourg City is one of the highest and most prestigious positions in Luxembourgian government and politics.

List of mayors of Luxembourg City

See also
 Luxembourg communal council
 Timeline of Luxembourg City

Footnotes

References
  List of mayors since 1800.  Luxembourg City official website.  Retrieved on 2006-07-14.

 
Luxembourg City
History of Luxembourg City